George Philip Balderson (born 11 October 2000) is an English professional cricketer. Balderson signed his first professional contract with Lancashire in 2018. Having captained England at Under-19 level, his deal was extended in November 2019. A month later he was named as the captain of England's squad for the 2020 Under-19 Cricket World Cup. Balderson made his first-class debut on 1 August 2020, for Lancashire in the 2020 Bob Willis Trophy. He made his List A debut on 25 July 2021, for Lancashire in the 2021 Royal London One-Day Cup.

References

External links
 

2000 births
Living people
Cricketers from Manchester
English cricketers
Lancashire cricketers